The big-headed Amazon River turtle (Peltocephalus dumerilianus), also known as the big-headed sideneck, is a species of turtle in the family Podocnemididae. The species is monotypic within the genus Peltocephalus.

Etymology
The specific name, dumerilianus, is in honor of French herpetologist André Marie Constant Duméril.

Geographic range
P. dumerilianus is found in Brazil (Amazonas, Pará), Colombia, French Guiana, Venezuela, Ecuador, and possibly in Peru.

Habitat
The preferred natural habitats of P. dumerilianus are rivers and freshwater swamps.

Reproduction
Like all other turtles, P. dumerilianus is oviparous.

References

Further reading
Boulenger GA (1889). Catalogue of the Chelonians, Rhynchocephalians, and Crocodiles in the British Museum (Natural History). New Edition. London: Trustees of the British Museum (Natural History). (Taylor and Francis, printers). x + 311 pp. + Plates I-III. (Podocnemis tracaxa, p. 206).
Schweigger [AF] (1812). "Prodromus Monographia Cheloniorum ". Königsberger Archiv für Naturwissenschaft und Mathematik 1: 271-368, 406-458. (Emys dumeriliana, new species, p. 300). (in Latin).

Peltocephalus
Turtles of South America
Fauna of the Amazon
Reptiles of Brazil
Reptiles of Colombia
Reptiles of Ecuador
Reptiles of French Guiana
Reptiles of Venezuela
Vulnerable animals
Vulnerable biota of South America
Reptiles described in 1812

Taxonomy articles created by Polbot